The Philippines has competed at every iteration of the Asian Para Games which was first held in Guangzhou, China. The Philippines has won a total of 46 medals in its participation in the Asian Para Games as of the 2018 edition; 10 of which are gold, 17 of which are silver, and 19 of which are bronze. The Philippines would participate in the third edition of the Games in Jakarta, Indonesia from October 6-13, 2018.

Asian Para Games

Medals by edition

Medals by sports

Asian Youth Para Games

Medals by edition

Medals by sports

See also
Philippines at the Asian Games

References

 
Nations at the Asian Para Games